Monotocheirodon is a genus of characins native to tropical South America.  The currently  recognized species in this genus are:
 Monotocheirodon drilos Menezes, S. H. Weitzman & Quagio-Grassioto, 2013
 Monotocheirodon kontos Menezes, S. H. Weitzman & Quagio-Grassioto, 2013
 Monotocheirodon pearsoni C. H. Eigenmann, 1924

References

Characidae